Republican Era can refer to:

 Minguo calendar, the official era of the Republic of China

It may also refer to any era in a country's history when it was governed as a republic or by a Republican Party. In particular, it may refer to:

 Roman Republic (509 BCE–27 BCE)
 Commonwealth of England (1649–1653)
 Republican Chile (1818–1891)
 History of Ecuador (1830–1860), the beginning of that country's republican era
 Republic of Cuba (1902–1959)
 Republic of China (1912–1949)
 Second Spanish Republic (1931–1939)
 Turkey (1922–present)